Erna Rahbek Pedersen (6 October 1926 – 2002) was a Danish archer who represented Denmark at the 1972 Summer Olympic Games in archery.

Career 

She finished 26th in the women's individual event with a score of 2244 points.

References

External links 
 Profile on worldarchery.org
  

1926 births
2002 deaths
Danish female archers
Olympic archers of Denmark
Archers at the 1972 Summer Olympics